Blessed Is the Fruit is a novel by Robert Antoni. Published in 1997 by Henry Holt, it explores the fluid boundaries of race in the Caribbean.

1997 novels
Trinidad and Tobago novels
Novels set in the Caribbean